The Superleague Formula round Belgium is a round of the Superleague Formula. Zolder exclusively holds Superleague Formula events in Belgium. Zolder has hosted events in 2008 and 2009.

Winners

References

External links
 Superleague Formula Official Website
 V12 Racing: Independent Superleague Formula Fansite Magazine

Belgium